Robert E. Lee is a bronze sculpture commemorating the general of the same name by Edward Virginius Valentine, formerly installed in the crypt of the United States Capitol as part of the National Statuary Hall Collection. The statue was given by the commonwealth of Virginia in 1909. On December 21, 2020, the sculpture was removed from the grounds of the United States Capitol and relocated to the Virginia Museum of History & Culture.

Replacement
On January 2, 2020, Virginia governor Ralph Northam requested a bill to remove the statue from the U.S. Capitol building. The idea came from United States representatives Jennifer Wexton and Donald McEachin. "These statutes aimed to rewrite Lee’s reputation from that of a cruel slave owner and Confederate General to portraying him as a kind man and reluctant war hero who selflessly served his home state of Virginia," Wexton and McEachin wrote in a letter to Northam. The pair suggested several potential candidates, including educator and orator Booker T. Washington and civil rights attorney Oliver Hill.

On December 16, 2020, the Commission on Historical Statues in the United States Capitol unanimously recommended that the Lee statue be replaced with a statue of civil rights activist Barbara Rose Johns as the Virginian representative within the collection. The statue of Robert E. Lee was removed from the National Statuary Hall five days later, on 21 December with Wexton, McEachin and Virginia United States Senator Tim Kaine in attendance. It was then transferred to the Virginia Museum of History & Culture.

See also
 1909 in art
 List of Confederate monuments and memorials

References

External links
 

1909 establishments in the United States
Monuments and memorials in the United States removed during the George Floyd protests
Bronze sculptures in Virginia
Bronze sculptures in Washington, D.C.
Buildings and structures in Richmond, Virginia
Confederate States of America monuments and memorials in Virginia
Confederate States of America monuments and memorials in Washington, D.C.
Lee, Robert
Sculptures of men in Virginia
Sculptures of men in Washington, D.C.
Statues of Robert E. Lee
Removed Confederate States of America monuments and memorials
Statues removed in 2020